Takashige Matsumoto (23 September 1908 – 8 March 2001) was a Japanese water polo player. He competed in the men's tournament at the 1932 Summer Olympics.

See also
 Japan men's Olympic water polo team records and statistics
 List of men's Olympic water polo tournament goalkeepers

References

External links
 

1908 births
2001 deaths
Japanese male water polo players
Water polo goalkeepers
Olympic water polo players of Japan
Water polo players at the 1932 Summer Olympics
Sportspeople from Hiroshima
20th-century Japanese people
21st-century Japanese people